An exchange offer in finance, corporate law and securities law, is a form of tender offer in which securities are offered as consideration instead of cash.

In a bond exchange offer, bondholders may consensually exchange their existing bonds for another class of debt or equity securities. Companies will often seek to exchange their securities to extend maturities, reduce debt outstanding or convert debt into equity.

See also
Financing
Tender offer

References

Bond market

he:הצעת רכש#הצעת רכש חליפין